"Fear Strikes Out" is a 1957 American biographical sports drama film depicting the life and career of American baseball player Jimmy Piersall. It is based on Piersall's 1955 memoir Fear Strikes Out: The Jim Piersall Story, co-written with Al Hirshberg. The film stars Anthony Perkins as Piersall and Karl Malden as his father, and it was the first directed by Robert Mulligan.

This film is a Paramount Picture and was preceded by a 1955 TV version starring Tab Hunter.

The format of the film allows documentary footage of the stadium scenes to be used during the game sequences.

Plot
Based on Piersall's autobiography, the film traces Piersall's rise from the sandlots of Waterbury, Connecticut, to the Boston Red Sox professional baseball team. Karl Malden plays his domineering father who pushes him further and further.

Plagued by problems, Jim marries Mary but they live with his parents. When he is eventually is chosen for the Boston Red Sox it is in the infield position of shortstop for which he has little experience. He calls his father to apologise.

Daunted by the huge crowd and the pressure of his father watching his first time at-bat, the pressure nearly causes Jim to strike out. But on the final pitch, he hits a home run. Rather than celebrate in a normal way, he instead runs to the backstop fence where his father sits shouting "look dad, I told you I could do it". His teammates try to restrain him as he climbs the fence. He swings his bat at them. Eventually the police subdue him, and he is taken to a mental institution.

After a long period of therapy, Jim realizes that he has excelled in baseball to please his father — not for his own gratification.

He went on to play 17 seasons in Major League Baseball (MLB) for five teams, from 1950 through 1967.

Cast
Anthony Perkins as Jim Piersall
Karl Malden as John Piersall
Norma Moore as Mary Piersall
Adam Williams as Dr. Brown
Perry Wilson as Mrs. Piersall
Peter J. Votrian as young Jim Piersall
Richard Bull as Reporter Slade (uncredited)
Bart Burns as Joe Cronin (uncredited)
Edd Byrnes as Boy in Car Assisting Jimmy Up Stairway (uncredited)
Art Gilmore as Broadcaster (voice, uncredited)
Brian G. Hutton as Bernie Serwill (uncredited)
Morgan Jones as Sandy Allen (uncredited)
Bing Russell as Ballplayer Holding Trophy (uncredited)
Gary Vinson as High School Ballplayer (uncredited)

1955 TV version
The film was based on the book by Piersall which had been adapted for TV in 1955 for the show Climax!.

Rights to the book were bought in July 1955.

The New York Times called it "absorbing" and praised Tab Hunter's portrayal of Jimmy Piersall as "perceptive and believable."

Hunter had a romantic relationship with Anthony Perkins. He says this relationship was strained after Perkins took the role of Piersall in the film version.

Awards and honors
Robert Mulligan was a Directors Guild of America Best Director nominee.

Fear Strikes Out was nominated for the American Film Institute's 2008 list in the sports film category.

Reception
In 1957, Bosley Crowther of The New York Times wrote: 

Dr. Sharon Packer wrote in 2012 that Fear Strikes Out is very unusual in cinematic history in that it portrays electroconvulsive therapy in a positive light.

Notes

External links

1955 TV version at IMDb

1957 films
1950s biographical drama films
1950s sports drama films
American biographical drama films
American baseball films
Biographical films about sportspeople
American black-and-white films
Boston Red Sox
1950s English-language films
Films scored by Elmer Bernstein
Films based on biographies
Films directed by Robert Mulligan
Films set in Boston
Films set in Massachusetts
Paramount Pictures films
Sports films based on actual events
Cultural depictions of baseball players
Cultural depictions of American men
American sports drama films
1957 directorial debut films
1957 drama films
1950s American films